Swiss Athletics is the governing body for the sport of athletics in Switzerland.

Affiliations 
World Athletics
European Athletic Association (EAA)
Swiss Olympic Association

National records 
Swiss Athletics maintains the Swiss records in athletics.

External links 
Official webpage

Switzerland
Athletics
National governing bodies for athletics
1905 establishments in Switzerland
Sports organizations established in 1905